Clifford Carter (December 10, 1898 – November 1979) was an American Negro league pitcher in the 1920s and 1930s.

A native of Lewistown, Pennsylvania, Carter made his Negro leagues debut in 1923 with the Baltimore Black Sox and Bacharach Giants. He went on to play for several teams, and finished his career in 1934 with the Bacharach club. Carter died in Philadelphia, Pennsylvania in 1979 at age 80.

References

External links
 and Baseball-Reference Black Baseball stats and Seamheads

1898 births
1979 deaths
Date of death missing
Bacharach Giants players
Baltimore Black Sox players
Harrisburg Giants players
Hilldale Club players
Philadelphia Stars players
Philadelphia Tigers players
Baseball pitchers
Baseball players from Pennsylvania
People from Lewistown, Pennsylvania
20th-century African-American sportspeople